Breaking Point is an American medical drama that aired on ABC from September 16, 1963, to April 27, 1964. The series, which was a spin-off of Ben Casey, stars Paul Richards and Eduard Franz. The series was created by Meta Rosenberg.

Synopsis
Richards stars as Dr. McKinley Thompson, the chief resident in psychiatry at York Hospital, a fictitious hospital in Los Angeles. Eduard Franz co-starred as Dr. Edward Raymer, the hospital's psychiatric clinical director. McKinley was called Dr. Mac by everyone on the staff, and the stories focused on the people who came to the psychiatric clinic for their help.

Cast

Main 
Paul Richards as Dr. McKinley Thompson
Eduard Franz as Dr. William Raymer

Guest stars 

 Bettye Ackerman
 Martin Balsam
 Shelley Berman
 James Callahan
 Michael Callan
 John Cassavetes
 Dabney Coleman
 Rosemary DeCamp
 James Daly
 Bradford Dillman
 Dianne Foster
 Anthony Franciosa
 Clint Howard
 Lillian Gish
 Virginia Gregg
 James Gregory
 Mariette Hartley
 Joey Heatherton
 Kim Hunter
 Russell Johnson
 Piper Laurie
 Carol Lawrence
 John Larkin
 Barry Livingston
 Robert Loggia
 Scott Marlowe
 Kevin McCarthy
 Ralph Meeker
 Burgess Meredith
 Alan Napier
 Kathleen Nolan
 Sheree North
 Edmond O'Brien
 Arthur O'Connell
 Jack Oakie
 Eleanor Parker
 Walter Pidgeon
 Gena Rowlands
 Hari Rhodes
 Mark Richman
 Cliff Robertson
 Ruth Roman
 Robert Ryan
 Telly Savalas
 Vito Scotti
 Jan Sterling
 Susan Strasberg
 Rip Torn
 Jack Warden

Episodes

Award nomination
Breaking Point writer Allan Sloane was nominated for an Emmy Award for "Outstanding Writing Achievement in Drama".

References

External links 
 

1963 American television series debuts
1964 American television series endings
1960s American drama television series
1960s American medical television series
American Broadcasting Company original programming
American television spin-offs
Black-and-white American television shows
English-language television shows
Television series by CBS Studios
Television shows set in Los Angeles
Works set in hospitals